Kenneth L. Gentry, Jr. (3 May 1950) is a Reformed theologian,  and an ordained minister in the Reformed Presbyterian Church General Assembly. He is particularly known for his support for and publication on the topics of orthodox preterism and postmillennialism in Christian eschatology, as well as for theonomy and Young Earth creationism. He holds that each of these theological distinctives are logical and theological extensions of his foundational theology, which is Calvinistic and Reformed.

Biography
Gentry was born in Chattanooga, Tennessee. He is married (since July 1971) and has three children and six grandchildren.

He received his B.A. in Biblical Studies from Tennessee Temple University (1973, cum laude). After graduating he enrolled at Grace Theological Seminary in Winona Lake, Indiana. After two years at Grace Seminary (1973–1975) he left dispensationalism, having become convinced of a covenant and Reformed theology. He transferred to Reformed Theological Seminary in Jackson, Mississippi (1975–1977). Upon completing studies at Reformed Theological Seminary he was awarded the M.Div. in 1977. After several years of pastoral ministry, he earned a Th.M. (1986) and a Th.D. (1987, magna cum laude) from Whitefield Theological Seminary, both in the field of New Testament.

While at Reformed Theological Seminary he studied under Greg L. Bahnsen, a leading presuppositional apologist. Though Gentry initially resisted the distinctive ethical and eschatological views of Bahnsen, he was eventually persuaded of both theonomic ethics and postmillennial eschatology and became a staunch co-defender of them with Bahnsen. Over the years he developed a close friendship with Bahnsen, often lecturing with him in conferences, co-writing a book with him (House Divided: The Break-up of Dispensational Theology), eventually joining the staff of Bahnsen's Southern California Center for Christian Studies, and finally contributing to the festschrift in honor of Bahnsen, titled: The Standard Bearer.

Gentry retired from full-time pastoral ministry in 2016 after serving more than thirty-five years in three conservative and Reformed denominations: The Presbyterian Church in America, The Orthodox Presbyterian Church, and The Reformed Presbyterian Church, General Assembly. He is the Director of GoodBirth Ministries, a non-profit religious educational ministry, "committed to sponsoring, subsidizing, and advancing serious Christian scholarship and education".

Writings
Gentry is the leading contemporary theological expositor of the early-date of Revelation (prior to A.D. 70) by the Apostle John. The partial preterist paradigm is a different eschatology than that held by most American Dispensationalist Christians, who maintain that the Great Tribulation hasn't yet occurred.

Kenneth Gentry's works The Beast of Revelation and He Shall Have Dominion attempt to explain the identity of the Beast and what God's true redemptive plan for humanity are. Gentry's work is considered by his followers to be important for soteriological reasons.

Gentry's work enfilades the error of much contemporary Christian pre-trib eschatology, also serving to argue that incorrect interpretation of the Bible is possible even by sincere experts.

Gentry is perhaps best known for his book Before Jerusalem Fell, which argues that the Book of Revelation was written before the destruction of Jerusalem in A.D. 70. He holds that many of the dramatic events in Revelation correspond to the persecution of Christians under the Roman imperium as well as to the Jewish War against Rome which resulted in the destruction of Jewish temple. This book is the published version of his doctoral dissertation in 1986 under the title "The Dating of the Book of Revelation: An Exegetical, Theological and Historical Argument for a Pre-A.D. 70 Composition."

Revelation commentary
Gentry has completed a two-volume academic commentary on Revelation titled: The Divorce of Israel: A Redemptive-Historical Interpretation. It is currently being proofed and typeset by Tolle Lege Press and is scheduled for release in May 2022. According to preliminary studies he has released ("The Wrath of God and Israel", Fountain Inn, SC: 2007), he will be presenting evidence that "Babylon" is a metaphor for 1st century Jerusalem, and that the book's author John is following the pattern of the Old Testament prophets in denouncing Jerusalem's unfaithfulness by such images (see especially  and ).

Gentry holds that the theme of Revelation is Christ's judgment-coming against those who pierced him, and presents the "slain Lamb" (etc.) as wreaking vengeance upon 1st-century Jerusalem. He argues that the seven-sealed scroll is God's divorce decree against his unfaithful Old Testament wife (Israel) so that he might take a new bride, the Church (Rev. 21-22). Thus, Revelation dramatizes the transition from the old covenant, Temple-based, Judaic economy to the New Covenant, spiritual economy that includes all ethnicities, not just Jews.

According to his research updates, Gentry sees strong similarities between Revelation and the Epistle to the Hebrews. Both works seek to demonstrate Christianity's superiority to Judaism by showing New Covenant Christianity fulfilling Old Covenant Judaism (Heb. 8:13; Rev. 2:9; 3:9; 11:1-2). He notes that both documents even end up pointing the reader to the New Jerusalem from heaven (Heb.12:22; Rev. 21:2), which represents Christianity. He also draws parallels in thought between the Gospel of Matthew and Revelation. He sees evidence for this in Matthew's strong imagery regarding old covenant Judaism's demise in the rise of Christianity (Matt. 8:10-12; 21:33-46; 22:1-13; 23:29-38).

Bibliography

The Christian Case Against Abortion (Footstool, 1982, 1986).   OCLC 23656588
The Christian and Alcoholic Beverages (Baker, 1986, 1990). 
The Charismatic Gift of Prophecy (Footstool, 1986, 1990  ; Wipf & Stock, 1999).
The Beast of Revelation (Institute for Christian Economics, 1989, 1994 ; American Vision, 2002 ).
Before Jerusalem Fell: Dating the Book of Revelation (I.C.E.: 1989 ; Christian Universities Press: 1997  ; American Vision: 1999 ).
House Divided: The Break-up of Dispensational Theology, with Greg L. Bahnsen (I.C.E., 1989; 1997). 
The Greatness of the Great Commission: The Christian Enterprise in a Fallen World (I.C.E., 1991, 1994). 
He Shall Have Dominion: A Postmillennial Eschatology (I.C.E., 1992; 1997  ; ApologeticsMedia, 2009 ).
Lord of the Saved: Getting to the Heart of the Lordship Debate (Presbyterian and Reformed, 1992). 
God’s Law in the Modern World: The Continuing Relevance of Old Testament Law (P&R, 1992 ; I.C.E., 1997  ).
The Great Tribulation: Past or Future? with Thomas D. Ice (Kregel, 1999). 
Perilous Times: A Study in Eschatological Evil (Covenant Media Foundation, 2000). 
God Gave Wine: What the Bible Says About Alcohol (Oak Leaf, 2001) [an expanded edition of the title on alcohol above]. 
Yea, Hath God Said? The Framework Hypothesis v. Six Day Creation with Michael R. Butler (Wipf & Stock, 2002). 
As It Is Written: The Genesis Account: Literal or Literary? (Master, 2016) 
Have We Missed the Second Coming? A Critique of the Hyper-Preterist Error (Victorious Hope, 2017) 
Tongues Speaking: Its Meaning, Purpose, and Cessation (Victorious Hope, 2014) 
Covenantal Theonomy: A Response to T. David Gordon and Klinean Covenantalism (Covenant Media Press, 2006). 
Nourishment from the Word: Select Studies in Reformed Doctrine (Nordskog, 2008). 
A Biblical Defense of Predestination (ApologeticsGroup Media, 2008). 
The Book of Revelation Made Easy: You Can Understand Bible Prophecy (American Vision, 2008). 
Navigating the Book of Revelation: Special Studies on Important Issues (GoodBirth Ministries, 2009). 
Postmillennialism Made Easy (ApologeticsGroup Media, 2009). 
Predestination Made Easy (ApologeticsGroup Media, 2009). 
God's Law Made Easy (ApologeticsGroup Media, 2010). 
Olivet Discourse Made Easy (ApologeticsGroup Media, 2010).

Contributions
"Private Charity Should Care for the Poor" in The Welfare State (David L. Bender, ed.) (Greenhaven Press, 1982). 
"Civil Sanctions in the New Testament," "Church Sanctions in the Epistle to the Hebrews," and "Whose Victory in History?" in Gary North, ed., Theonomy: An Informed Response (I.C.E., 1991). 
"The Preterist View" in Four Views on the Book of Revelation (ed. Marvin Pate) (Zondervan, 1998). 
"The Postmillennial View" in Three Views of the Millennium and Beyond (ed., Darrell Bock) (Zondervan, 1999). 
"Reformed Theology and Six Day Creationism" in P. Andrew Sandlin, ed., Creation According to the Scriptures: A Presuppositional Defense of Literal, Six Day Creation (Chalcedon, 2001). 
"A Revelation of the Revelation" and "Theonomy and Confession" in Robert R. Booth, ed., The Standard Bearer: A Festschrift for Greg L. Bahnsen (Covenant Media Foundation, 2002). 
"The Historical Problem with Hyper-Preterism" in Hyper-Preterism: A Reformed Critique, ed. Keith A. Mathison (P & R 2003). 
"Agony, Irony and the Postmillennialist" and "Victory Belongs to the Lord" in Thine Is the Kingdom: A Summary of the Postmillennial Hope, ed. by Kenneth L. Gentry, Jr. (Ross House, 2004). 
"Pauline Communion v. Paedocommunion" in Joseph A. Pipa, Jr. and C. N. Willborn, eds., The Covenant: God’s Voluntary Condescension (Presbyterian Press, 2005). 
"Defending the Faith" in Bodie Hodge and Roger Patterson, eds., World Religions and Cults: Counterfeits of Christianity (Master, 2015).

References

External links
Gentry's official website
GoodBirth Ministries Gentry's non-profit research ministry website

1950 births
Living people
American Presbyterians
American Calvinist and Reformed theologians
Christian reconstructionism
Tennessee Temple University alumni
People from Chattanooga, Tennessee
20th-century Calvinist and Reformed theologians